Laurien Berenson is an American writer of murder mystery and romance novels since 1983; in her earlier career she used the pen name Laurien Blair. She is most noted for her Melanie Travis Mysteries series, and her novels have been published in several languages.

She is a winner of the Romantic Times Reviewers' Choice Award, and a four-time winner of the Maxwell Award (presented by the Dog Writers Association of America). She has been nominated for both the Agatha and Macavity awards.

She currently lives in Kentucky with her family.

Bibliography

As Laurien Blair

Romance
 Sweet Temptation, Silhouette Desire #105. 1983
 Between The Covers, Silhouette Desire #130. 1984
 That Special Magic, Silhouette Desire # 210. 1985
 Taken By Storm, Silhouette Desire #243. 1985

As Laurien Berenson

Romance
 Come As You Are, Bantam Loveswept #109. 1985
 Winner Take All, Harlequin American Romance #210. 1987
 Lucky in Love, Harlequin Temptation #255. 1989
 Talisman, Harlequin Temptation #310. 1990
 The Sweetheart Deal, Harlequin Temptation #368. 1991

Young adult
 Double Dare, First Love/Silhouette #208. 1986

Psychological suspense
 Night Cries. 1992
 Deep Cover. 1994

Melanie Travis Mysteries series
In the Melanie Travis series of murder mysteries, the primary protagonist is a school teacher, Melanie Travis, who owns and shows several full size pedigree Standard Poodles. All of her (mis)adventures involve the dog show circuit in varying degrees, providing an entertaining view into the world of raising and showing dogs.

 A Pedigree To Die For. 1995.  .
 Underdog. 1996. .
 Dog Eat Dog. 1996. .
 Hair of the Dog. 1997.  .
 Watchdog. 1998. .
 Hush Puppy. 1999.  .
 Unleashed. 2000. .
 Once Bitten. 2001. .
 Hot Dog. 2002. .
 Best in Show. 2003. .
 Jingle Bell Bark. 2004. .
 Raining Cats & Dogs. 2005. .
 Chow Down. 2006. .
 Hounded To Death. 2007.  .
 Doggie Day Care Murder. 2008.  .
 Gone with the Woof. September 2013. .
 Death of a Dog Whisperer. August 2014. .
 The Bark Before Christmas. July 28, 2015. .
   A Christmas Howl. October 27, 2015 eBook only 

Also, books below.  Note:  Sources contradict on book numbering due to the novella "A Christmas Howl."  Some current books are missing below.  
 Live and Let Growl. May 30, 2017. .
 Wagging Through The Snow. September 25, 2018. .
 Ruff Justice . May 28, 2019. .

Short stories
Sleeping Dogs Lie in CANINE CRIMES ANTHOLOGY, edited by Jeffrey Marks. 1998.
This story was nominated for an Agatha Award and Macavity Award.

References and sources

 http://www.laurienberenson.com

American crime writers
American romantic fiction writers
Living people
Writers from Kentucky
Year of birth missing (living people)
Place of birth missing (living people)
Women mystery writers
Women romantic fiction writers